Gardners Bay is a rural residential locality and a body of water in the local government area of Huon Valley in the South-east region of Tasmania. The 2016 census has a population of 329 for the state suburb of Gardners Bay.

History
Gardners Bay was gazetted as a locality in 1971.

Geography
The waters of Gardners Bay and Purcells Bay form the western boundary. Gardners Bay (the body of water) and Purcells Bay are inlets of Port Cygnet.

Road infrastructure
The B68 route (Channel Highway) enters from the north-west and follows the coast to the south-west, where it exits. Route C627 (Woodbridge Hill Road) starts at an intersection with B68 and runs east through the locality until it exits at the eastern boundary.

References

Localities of Huon Valley Council
Towns in Tasmania
Bays of Tasmania